Boat Builders is an animated short film produced by Walt Disney, distributed by RKO Radio Pictures and released on February 25, 1938. The film was directed by Ben Sharpsteen and animated by Frenchy de Trémaudan, Eddie Strickland, Clyde Geronimi, Paul Satterfield, Archie Robin, Don Patterson. It was the 99th short in the Mickey Mouse film series to be released, and the first for that year.

Plot
In this short, Mickey Mouse and his friends Donald Duck and Goofy attempt to build a boat (which they name Queen Minnie), which is made from fold-out parts (the instructions simply say "All You Do Is Put It Together" and "Even A Child Can Do It"), though they encounter problems as they go (such as Donald painting the rudder which keeps being turned by Mickey, and Goofy idiotically thinking the Figurehead is an actual woman). Their maiden voyage turns out to be their last, as the boat collapses as she sets sail, thanks to Minnie Mouse hitting the champagne bottle to christen the boat just a little too hard.

Voice cast
 Mickey Mouse: Walt Disney
 Donald Duck: Clarence Nash
 Goofy: Pinto Colvig
 Minnie Mouse: Marcellite Garner

Releases
1938 – Original theatrical release
1957 – The Mickey Mouse Club, episode #3.24 (TV)
c. 1972 – The Mouse Factory, episode #1.7: "Water Sports" (TV)
c. 1983 – Good Morning, Mickey!, episode #1 (TV)
1989 – The Magical World of Disney, episode #33.15: "Mickey's Happy Valentine Special" (TV)
c. 1992 – Mickey's Mouse Tracks, episode #16 (TV)
c. 1992 – Donald's Quack Attack, episode #34 (TV)
1998 – The Ink and Paint Club, episode #39: "Minnie Mouse" (TV)
2007 – Reissued with 2D version of Meet the Robinsons (theatrical)
2011 – Have a Laugh!, episode #25 (TV)

Home media
The short was released on December 4, 2001, on Walt Disney Treasures: Mickey Mouse in Living Color.

Additional releases include:
1981 – "Mickey Mouse and Donald Duck Cartoon Collections Volume Three" (VHS)
1989 – "Cartoon Classics: Mickey and the Gang" (VHS)
2018 – Celebrating Mickey (Blu-ray/DVD/Digital)

See also
Mickey Mouse (film series)

References

External links
 
 
 

1938 films
1930s color films
1938 animated films
1930s Disney animated short films
Mickey Mouse short films
Donald Duck short films
Goofy (Disney) short films
Films directed by Ben Sharpsteen
Films produced by Walt Disney
Films set on ships
Films scored by Leigh Harline
Films scored by Oliver Wallace
1930s American films